The  New York Giants season was the franchise's 17th season in the National Football League.

Season recap
The Giants managed to put together quite a respectable team this year. Ed Danowski was lured out of retirement, Tuffy Leemans' back healed, and Mel Hein was talked out of a potential retirement. The Giants sailed through their first five games—only the Washington Redskins came within a touchdown of them as they outscored their first five opponents, 122–27. But the Brooklyn Dodgers, coached by Jock Sutherland and guided on the field by All-Pro Ace Parker, proved the Giants' most formidable opponents, dealing them two of their three defeats this year.

The Giants clinched the Eastern Division title weeks in advance of the regular season finale, but no NFL players could have been prepared for the Attack on Pearl Harbor to occur less than fifteen minutes before kickoff of Week 14; the three games that day were not interrupted, but a bye week was observed before proceeding to the championship game.

Schedule

Note: Intra-division opponents are in bold text.

Game Summaries

Week Two: at Philadelphia Eagles

Week Four: at Washington Redskins

Week Five: at Pittsburgh Steelers

Week Six: vs. Philadelphia Eagles

Week Seven: vs. Pittsburgh Steelers

Week Eight: at Brooklyn Dodgers

Week Nine: vs. Chicago Cardinals

Week Ten: vs. Detroit Lions

Week Eleven: vs. Cleveland Rams

Week Twelve: vs. Washington Redskins

Week Fourteen: vs. Brooklyn Dodgers

Playoffs

1941 NFL Championship: at Chicago Bears

Standings

External links
1941 New York Giants season at Pro-Football-Reference

See also
List of New York Giants seasons

New York Giants seasons
New York Giants
New York
1940s in Manhattan
Washington Heights, Manhattan